Anetarca armata is a species of sea slug, specifically an aeolid nudibranch. It is a marine gastropod mollusc in the family Facelinidae.

Distribution
This species was described from the Pacific Ocean coast of Baja California at Punta Asuncion, Mexico. It is reported from Bahía de los Ángeles, within the Gulf of California.

References

Facelinidae
Gastropods described in 1991